Patrick "Pat" Finn (born July 24, 1956) is an American television presenter and game show host. He is the owner of the production company Rubicon Entertainment. Finn's first national gig was hosting the 1990 remake of the classic Jack Barry show The Joker's Wild. In 1991, he became host of Shop 'til You Drop, the #1 rated cable game show in America at the time, where he remained for 11 years, and from 1999–2009 he became the host of the California State Lottery's weekly game show, The Big Spin.

Finn was born in Wilkes-Barre, Pennsylvania, the first of five sons also born to William and Celia Mae Finn, who was a Sunday School teacher and a telephone operator. Finn attended James M. Coughlin High School, from which he graduated in 1974. Prior to entering national television, Finn was a local weatherman, first on WBRE (Channel 28) in Wilkes-Barre, PA; WPXI (Channel 11) in Pittsburgh, where he also served as an entertainment correspondent; KPNX (Channel 12) in Phoenix; and KRON (Channel 4) in San Francisco.

In the mid-1980s, while in Phoenix, Finn also hosted Finn and Friends, a number one-rated local variety show that aired weeknights after the local news.

In the 1990s, Finn formed his own production company, Rubicon Entertainment (formerly InFinnIty Productions). He's since been the creator and Executive Producer of TV shows for NBC, Lifetime, MTV, VH1, FX, GSN and Prime Video.

Finn is also Executive Producer of Results Producers, a leading Direct Response production company. 

Finn is very active in his church, the Agape International Spiritual Center and has helped raise over $5 million for charities, including his favorite, The US Foundation For the Children of Haiti at Hope Hospital in Port-au-Prince.

He was a Forum Leader for Landmark Worldwide and is currently the founder and head coach for Rubicon Results an international peak performance coaching business.

Finn has twin daughters, Sienna Mae and Sofia Rae, born on February 7, 2008. He also has a son Corey (born in 1989) and a daughter Kaitlyn (born in 1993).

References

External links

 Results Producers (Pat's company) website
 

1956 births
American game show hosts
Living people
People from Wilkes-Barre, Pennsylvania